Jean de Lareinty-Tholozan (born 19 January 1890, date of death unknown) was a French sports shooter. He competed in the team clay pigeon event at the 1920 Summer Olympics.

References

External links
 

1890 births
Year of death missing
French male sport shooters
Olympic shooters of France
Shooters at the 1920 Summer Olympics
Place of birth missing